The former United States Court House, Custom House, and Post Office in Brownsville, Texas, also known as the Old Federal Courthouse,  is a former courthouse of the United States District Court for the Southern District of Texas, and currently serves as Brownsville City Hall. Completed in 1931, the building replaced the 1892 U.S. Court House, Custom House, and Post Office of that city, which was razed in 1931. The replacement for the 1931 building was, in turn, completed in 1999.

The four-story building is located at 1001 East Elizabeth Street, and still houses an office of the United States Postal Service.

Gallery

External links
Federal Judicial Center Historic Federal Courthouses page on the United States Court House, Custom House, and Post Office.

Buildings and structures in Brownsville, Texas
Government buildings completed in 1931
Former federal courthouses in the United States
City halls in Texas
Custom houses in the United States